Your Grace Finds Me was the third live album from contemporary worship musician Matt Redman, which it was released by the dual labels sixstepsrecords and Sparrow Records on 24 September 2013, and it was produced by Nathan Nockels. This was Redman's eleventh album for his career. The album has achieved commercial charting successes, as well as, it has received critical acclaim from music critics.

Music and lyrics
At Worship Leader, Andrea Hunter wrote that "The songs reel you in and keep you singing; they are filled with hope and joy and proclaim a God who is gracious, merciful, loving and just." Mark Geil of Jesus Freak Hideout said that "When it works, the album works exceedingly well, and Redman continues to grow as an important and valued praise and worship songwriter. Many of these songs will certainly impact the church, consistently pointing believers to our God and the grace that spans a universe to find us." At HM, Sarah Arendas Roberts wrote that "As his music usually does, Matt Redman's new album meets you and ushers you into a place on honesty before the living God; worship follows."

Kevin Davis of New Release Tuesday stated that the release "keeps Matt's signature holy energy flowing, and has plenty more songs that you'll soon be singing with fellow believers", and it "provides listeners with twelve tracks of vertical offerings to God that you can sing in any circumstance." At Louder Than the Music, Dave Wood wrote that "Somehow worship songs feel more real when they are recorded live, in front of a room full of people whose focus is on worshiping God. Matt Redman has again shown his willingness and ability to produce songs the global church can claim as their own. With a fresh sound, thought-out arrangements and lyrics that are steeped in worship".

Critical reception

Your Grace Finds Me garnered critical acclaim by music critics. Matt Conner of CCM Magazine said that the release "comfortably fits in the catalog as another loaded live offering." At HM, Sarah Arendas Roberts affirmed that "If you enjoy quality musicianship, Matt Redman's vocals, and music that will lead you into the worship place — that you can sing along with — you will thoroughly enjoy Redman's new album," which she called "Beautiful." Tom Jurek of AllMusic felt that the release "will certainly resonate with fans."

At Worship Leader, Andrea Hunter proclaimed that "Truly, every song on Your Grace Finds Me is tailored for some part of the service of worship." Tony Cummings of Cross Rhythms evoked that this album "shows that he is still the world Church's most consistent creator of heartwarming worship songs." At Jesus Freak Hideout, Mark Geil highlighted that "Your Grace Finds Me is poised to continue the wave, and though it has its weaker moments, there is much to be celebrated on Redman's latest."

Jay Heilman of Christian Music Review alluded to how "If you are looking for the total worship experience in a way that Redman has continuously drawn fans for years, then Your Grace Finds Me is one you will want to find yourself immersed in." At Louder Than the Music, Dave Wood called the release "a brilliant modern praise album." Kevin Davis of New Release Tuesday felt that this album was "an excellent follow-up" to his last release.

Chart performance
For the Billboard charting week of 12 October 2013, Your Grace Finds Me was the No. 28 most sold album in the entirety of the United States by the Billboard 200, and it was the No. 1 Top Christian Album sold the same week.

Track listing

Personnel 
 Matt Redman – lead vocals 
 Nathan Nockels – keyboards, programming, various instrumentation, backing vocals 
 Gabe Scott – synthesizer programming, dulcimer, beats 
 Willie Weeks – synthesizer programming, banjo, beats
 Bryan Brown – acoustic guitar, backing vocals 
 Daniel Carson – guitars 
 James Duke – guitars 
 Matt Podelsa – guitars 
 Jon Duke – bass
 Jacob Arnold – drums 
 Jules Adekambi – backing vocals
 Jorge Mhondera – backing vocals 
 Christy Nockels – backing vocals
 Beth Redman – backing vocals

Production
 Nathan Nockels – producer, overdub recording 
 Louie Giglio – executive producer
 Shelley Giglio – executive producer, art direction, management 
 Brad O'Donnell – executive producer 
 Neil Collins – engineer
 Jim Dineen – engineer 
 Dan Swift – engineer 
 Luke Fellingham – vocal engineer 
 Stephen Bailey – live sound recording 
 Ainslie Grosser – mixing 
 Ted Jensen – mastering 
 Jess Chambers – A&R 
 Mike McCloskey – A&R, management 
 Leighton Ching – art direction, design 
 Gary Dorsey – cover layout 
 Anne H. Neilson – cover painting 
 Brooke Bennett – photography 
 Mary Caroline Mann – photography
 Bobby Russell – photography

Charts

References

2013 albums
Matt Redman albums
Sparrow Records albums
Sparrow Records live albums